{{DISPLAYTITLE:C7H8O}}
The molecular formula C7H8O (molar mass: 108.13 g/mol, exact mass: 108.057515 u) may refer to:

 Anisole
 Benzyl alcohol
 Cresols
 o-Cresol
 m-Cresol
 p-Cresol
Also possible hetero aromatic compounds containing oxygen(5 membered rings)